Greatest Hits is American country music artist Keith Whitley's first compilation album, released a year after his death. It was released in 1990 by RCA Records. It peaked at No. 5 on the Top Country Albums chart, and was certified platinum by the RIAA. One single was released from it: "'Til a Tear Becomes a Rose", an overdubbed duet with his widow, Lorrie Morgan. It reached No. 13 on the Billboard Hot Country Singles & Tracks chart.  The album was certified platinum by the RIAA on June 24, 1993. It has sold 991,900 copies in the United States as of October 2019.

Track listing

Charts

Weekly charts

Year-end charts

References

Keith Whitley albums
1990 greatest hits albums
Albums produced by Garth Fundis
RCA Records compilation albums